Birke Jasmin Bertelsmeier (born 23 April 1981) is a German composer.

Life 
After graduating from high school, she studied piano with Pavel Gililov at the Hochschule für Musik und Tanz Köln (diploma 2005) and composition with Wolfgang Rihm at the Hochschule für Musik Karlsruhe (diploma 2008, concert exam 2011). She also completed a master's degree in musicology in 2009. Her works are performed at international festivals and by various performers, such as the Arditti Quartet, Quatuor Diotima, Ensemble Modern, Ensemble ascolta, Ensemble recherche, Fukio Saxophone Quartet, Marc Bouchkov, Erik Nielsen, Christoph Eschenbach, Tabea Zimmermann, Orchester Nationale de Lorraine, Bamberg Symphony and by members of the Berliner Philharmonic. In 2017, her orchestral work for the 80th anniversary of the Bombing of Guernica was premiered for the Bilbao Orkestra Sinfonikoa with choir and children's choir.

In 2014, two music theatre works, Querelle of Brest after Jean Genet and The Nightingale and the Rose after Oscar Wilde's short story of that name, were premiered at the Deutsche Oper Berlin, and at  Taschenopernfestival [Pocket Opera Festival] in Salzburg in 2017 the piece Gib mir Dein after a story by Thomas Mann.

Bertelsmeier taught composition in youth seminars at the Beethoven House and the  [State Music Council of North Rhine-Westphalia]. From 2009 to 2011, she taught improvisation and composition at the Hochschule für Musik, Theater und Medien Hannover.

Prizes and scholarships 
 2006/07 Scholarship of the Hoepfner Foundation
 2009 Scholarship of the Brahms House
 2009 Scholarship Dorothea Erxleben Hannover
 2010 Laureate of the Yvar Mikhashoff Competition NY
 2011/12 Scholarship of the International Ensemble Modern Academy
 2011/13 Scholarship of the Akademie Musiktheater heute
 2012 Residency scholarship of the 
 2012 Schneider-Schott Music Prize
 2013 Scholarship of the German Academy Villa Massimo
 2014 Karlsruhe Composition Prize
 2015 Ernst von Siemens Composer Prize
2016/17 IRCAM Paris (Institut de Recherche ot Coordination Acoustique /Musique).
2018/19 International House of Artists Villa Concordia Bamberg

References

External links 
 
 Birke J. Bertelsmeier, Verlag Dohr
 

21st-century classical composers
21st-century German composers
German women composers
1981 births
Living people
People from Hilden